Sophie Santos is an American comedian, writer and author of the comedic memoir, The One You Want to Marry (And Other Identities I've Had), Santos's book won the Lambda Literary Award in the Lesbian Memoir/Biography category.

Biography 
Santos was born to  Filipino-Spanish U.S. Army officer father and a nurse mother and frequently moved homes as a child and teenager.

Career
Santos has appeared on Jimmy Kimmel Live! and has written for Bravo and MTV.

Santos also hosted her live queer female-driven comedy and variety show Lesbian Agenda in Los Angeles.

In 2022, she and queer director Amy Bianco created a music video for the comedy song "Sisters", depicting the daily life of a lesbian.

The One You Want to Marry (And Other Identities I've Had)

In 2021, She penned her memoir The One You Want to Marry (And Other Identities I've Had) for which she received Lesbian Memoir/Biography category at Lambda Literary Award. In this memoir, she discussed her life as a tomboy youth.

References

External links 
 Sophie Santos Official Website

Living people

Year of birth missing (living people)
American people of Filipino descent
American people of Spanish descent
American LGBT writers
21st-century American women
American LGBT people of Asian descent